Leo Meyer (29 August 1873, in Karlino – 11 February 1944) was a German film producer. He is sometimes also credited as Leo Meijer. Following the Nazi rise to power Meyer, who was Jewish, went into exile and emigrated to the Netherlands where he continued to produce films.

Amongst the films that Meyer worked on in Weimar Germany was the war film Westfront 1918

Selected filmography
 Rinaldo Rinaldini (1927)
 Circle of Lovers (1927)
 Sex in Chains (1928)
 Somnambul (1929)
 Marriage in Trouble (1929)
 Westfront 1918 (1930)
 Panic in Chicago (1931)
 The First Right of the Child (1932)

References

Bibliography
 Ashkenazi, Ofer. Weimar Film and Modern Jewish Identity. Palgrave Macmillan, 2012.

External links

1873 births
1944 deaths
German film producers
Jewish emigrants from Nazi Germany to the Netherlands
People from Białogard County